Shawnigan station is a former railway station in Shawnigan Lake, British Columbia. It was a flag stop on the Via Rail Dayliner service. The station is indefinitely closed since 2011 due to poor track conditions along the line.

References 

Via Rail stations in British Columbia
Disused railway stations in Canada